A highly totient number  is an integer that has more solutions to the equation , where  is Euler's totient function, than any integer below it. The first few highly totient numbers are

1, 2, 4, 8, 12, 24, 48, 72, 144, 240, 432, 480, 576, 720, 1152, 1440 , with 2, 3, 4, 5, 6, 10, 11, 17, 21, 31, 34, 37, 38, 49, 54, and 72 totient solutions respectively.

The totient of a number , with prime factorization , is the product:

Thus, a highly totient number is a number that has more ways of being expressed as a product of this form than does any smaller number.

The concept is somewhat analogous to that of highly composite numbers, and in the same way that 1 is the only odd highly composite number, it is also the only odd highly totient number (indeed, the only odd number to not be a nontotient). And just as there are infinitely many highly composite numbers, there are also infinitely many highly totient numbers, though the highly totient numbers get tougher to find the higher one goes, since calculating the totient function involves factorization into primes, something that becomes extremely difficult as the numbers get larger.

Example
There are five numbers (15, 16, 20, 24, and 30) whose totient number is 8.  No positive integer smaller than 8 has as many such numbers, so 8 is highly totient.

Table

See also 
 Highly cototient number

References

 L. Havelock, A Few Observations on Totient and Cototient Valence from PlanetMath

Integer sequences